The Director of Intelligence attempted to oversee the workings of intelligence officers in the IRA's local units across the island.

Director of Intelligence of the Irish Republican Army (1917–1922)

Director of Intelligence of the (anti-Treaty) Irish Republican Army (1922–1969)

a.  Griffin was Director of Intelligence of the IRA's Four Courts General Headquarters

b.  Hyde was Director of Intelligence of the IRA's Field Headquarters General Headquarters

Director of Intelligence of the Provisional Irish Republican Army (1969–2005)

See also
Irish Republican Army
Chief of Staff of the Irish Republican Army
IRA Quartermaster General

References

Irish Republican Army
1917 establishments in Ireland
Intelligence operations